Micromonospora palomenae is a bacterium from the genus Micromonospora which has been isolated from the nymphs of the bug Palomena viridissima in Harbin, China.

References

 

Micromonosporaceae
Bacteria described in 2015